Israeli torture in the occupied territories refers to the use of torture and systematic degrading practices on Palestinians detained by Israeli forces in both the West Bank and the Gaza Strip. The practice, routine for decades, was eventually reviewed in the Supreme Court of Israel (1999) which found that "coercive interrogation" of Palestinians had been widespread, and deemed it unlawful, though permissible in certain cases. Torture is also practiced by the Palestinian authorities in the West Bank and the Gaza Strip.

History
According to Lisa Hajjar (2005) and Dr. Rachel Stroumsa, the director of the Public Committee Against Torture in Israel, torture has been an abiding characteristic of Israeli methods of interrogation of Palestinians. Though formally banned by the High Court in 1999, legalized exceptions, authorized by the Attorney General of Israel, persist:

Reports of torture as a means of extracting confessions arguably began early in the occupation, on evidence for the first decade. In June 1977 the Sunday Times claimed torture was used against the Arab population of the occupied territories. In early 1978 an employee of the US Consulate in East Jerusalem, Alexandra Johnson, sent two cables detailing evidence Israeli authorities were systematically using torture on West Bank suspects in Nablus, Ramallah, Hebron and the Russian compound of Jerusalem. Early reports indicated detainees were stripped naked and subject for long periods to cold showers or cold air ventilation. People were hung from meat hooks in Hebron and Ramallah. She concluded torture was applied at three rising levels of maltreatment, (a) level one: daily beatings with fists and sticks; (b) level two: alternate immersions of the victim in hot and cold water, beating of genitals and interrogation about twice daily over several hours; (c) level three: rotating teams of interrogators working on a nude person under detention by applying electrical devices, high frequency sonic noise, refrigeration, prolonged hanging by the hands or feet, and inserting objects into their penises or rectums. This last level was used on those who refused at earlier levels to denounce other Palestinians. 78-80% of a sample of detainees in 1985 said they had been sexually molested, and 67% stated they had been humiliated on religious grounds. Former inmates of the secret detention centre Camp 1391, whose existence is not even officially acknowledged, claim sexual harassment, even rape, forms part of the interrogation techniques. The first important study was conducted by the first Palestinian NGO, al-Haq, in 1986, which focused on practices at the Al Fara'a Detention Centre.

Other techniques include shabeh, a practice 76% of the Israel public (1998) thought a form of torture, but only 27% opposed its use against Palestinians. This consists of being forced to sit on a very small chair, with a filthy hood over one's head, as blaring music is drummed into one's ears. It could, as with one woman, last up to 10 days, night and day; also included among torture techniques was the beating of the bare soles of detainees' feet (falaqa), or subjecting them, while deprived of sleep, to endless lectures on themes like: "All Arabs are Bedouin, and Bedouin are Saudis, so Palestinians should go back to Saudi Arabia, where they came from. You don't belong here." Blindfolding is used so that the suspect can never anticipate when he is to be struck. In the First Intifada, other than prolonged beatings, people, including children, could be smeared with vomit or urine, be confined in a "coffin", be suspended by the wrists; be denied food and water or access to toilets, or be threatened to have their sisters, wives or mothers raped.
Methods, including torture, practiced also on Palestinian children were reported to persist with Amnesty International stating in 2018 that though over 1,000 complaints have been filed regarding these practices since 2001, "no criminal investigations were opened."

One major case, in which 20 men from Beita and Huwara were taken from their homes, gagged and bound hand and foot and then had their limbs broken with clubs, eventually reached the Israeli Supreme Court. In 2017, the alleged torture of Fawzi al-Junaidi, a 16 year old Palestinian boy, in Israeli detention drew media spotlight. A roadside bomb in 2019 leading to the death of an Israeli girl triggered a manhunt by the Shin Bet where up to 50 Palestinians were rounded up and reportedly subjected to some form of torture. 3 of the alleged suspects were hospitalised, one of them with kidney failure and 11 broken ribs while another was "nearly unrecognisable to his wife when he was wheeled into a courtroom".

Such torture is not thought to be very effective. A West Bank member of Hamas gave evidence under torture implicating himself and that organization in the 2014 kidnapping and murder of Israeli teenagers. The extorted confession turned out to be false. Recourse to Israeli courts to obtain recompense and rehabilitation for the psychological damage caused by being tortured are rarely conceded and are exceptional. Financial settlements were given for cases in the 1980s and 1990s, but only if the victim underwrote a clause which absolved the state of Israeli of declaring that the plaintiff had been a victim of torture.

Notes

Citations

Sources

Further reading

Torture in Israel
Political violence in the State of Palestine
Political violence in Israel